Metamorphogenesis is the third studio album by the British doom metal band Esoteric. It was released in August 1999 through Eibon records.

Track listing

Credits
 Bryan Beck -- Bass guitar
 Gordon Bicknell -- Guitar
 Greg Chandler -- vocals, guitar
 Steve Peters -- Guitar
 Keith York -- drums
 Guest vocals on "The Secret of the Secret" by Tom Kvalsvoll

1999 albums
Esoteric (band) albums